Mathiasbreen is a glacier in Sørkapp Land at Spitsbergen, Svalbard. It has a length of about five kilometers, and is located between the mountains Keilhaufjellet and Kistefjellet. The glacier is named after Norwegian geologist Baltazar Mathias Keilhau.

References

Glaciers of Spitsbergen